
Year 295 (CCXCV) was a common year starting on Tuesday (link will display the full calendar) of the Julian calendar, the 295th Year of the Common Era (CE) and Anno Domini (AD) designations, the 295th year of the 1st millennium, the 95th year and last 6 years of the 3rd century, and the 6th year of the 290s decade. At the time, it was known as the Year of the Consulship of Tuscus and Anullinus (or, less frequently, year 1048 Ab urbe condita). The denomination 295 for this year has been used since the early medieval period, when the Anno Domini calendar era became the prevalent method in Europe for naming years.

Events 
 By place 
 Roman Empire 
 Emperor Diocletian defeats the Carpi.
 Caesar Galerius completes a series of two campaigns in Upper Egypt, against the rebel cities of Coptos and Boresis, as well as the Blemmyes and Meroitic Nubians.
 The jurist Hermogenianus, at the court of Diocletian, produces the Hermogenian Code. This new codification of Roman law complements the Gregorian Code of c. 292.
 Diocletian, perhaps through Galerius, issues an edict against incest.

 China 
 Tuoba Luguan divides the territory of the Tuoba clan into three areas. His nephews Tuoba Yilu and Tuoba Yituo become chieftains of the western and central areas of (Shanxi province). Tuoba Luguan dominates the eastern area (near Hohhot).

 By topic 
 Religion 
 Petra rejoins the province of Palestine, and is converted to Christianity by the Syrian monk Barsauma.

Births 
 Shi Hu, Chinese emperor of Later Zhao (d. 349)

Deaths 
 Maximilian of Tebessa, Berber Christian saint and martyr

References